Rodolfo Blanco (born June 14, 1966) is a Colombian former professional boxer who held the International Boxing Federation (IBF) flyweight title in 1992.

Blanco became a professional boxer in 1982. In 1987 he challenged Myung Woo Yuh for the World Boxing Association light flyweight title, losing by an eighth-round knockout. In 1990 he once again challenged for a world title, this time in the flyweight class. Northern Irish boxer Dave McAuley defeated Blanco by a unanimous decision to retain the IBF title. Two years later, on June 11, 1992, McAuley and Blanco met again, this time with Blanco prevailing by a unanimous decision and taking the title.

Blanco lost the title in his first defense when Thai Pichit Sitbangprachan knocked him out in three rounds on November 11, 1992. Blanco never won another world championship, although he did win the North American Boxing Federation super flyweight title in 1997. The next year he challenged Johnny Tapia for the IBF and WBO super flyweight titles, losing in twelve rounds.

Blanco continued to fight until 2002.

External links
 

1966 births
Living people
Flyweight boxers
World boxing champions
World flyweight boxing champions
International Boxing Federation champions
People from Sucre Department
Colombian male boxers
20th-century Colombian people